Elections to City of Lincoln Council in Lincolnshire, England, were held on 1 May 2003. One third of the Council was up for election and the Labour Party stayed in overall control of the council.

A trial took place for all postal voting leading to turnout increasing from 26% in 2002 to 47% in this election.

After the election, the composition of the council was:
Labour 27
Conservative 6

Election result

Ward results

Abbey

Birchwood

Boultham

Bracebridge

Carholme

Castle

Glebe

Hartsholme

Minster

Moorland

Park

References

2003 Lincoln election result
Ward results

2003 English local elections
2003
2000s in Lincolnshire